Cheputarai or Chephutarai was the king of Lanna from 1675 until 1707, when it was under Burmese suzerainty.

References

Rulers of Chiang Mai
17th-century monarchs in Asia
18th-century monarchs in Asia
18th-century Thai monarchs